Fate as a Rat is a 2001 Bulgarian film directed by Ivan Pavlov. It was Bulgaria's submission to the 74th Academy Awards for the Academy Award for Best Foreign Language Film, but eventually was not nominated.

See also

Cinema of Bulgaria
List of submissions to the 74th Academy Awards for Best Foreign Language Film

References

External links

2001 films
Bulgarian comedy films
2000s Bulgarian-language films
2000s crime comedy films
2001 comedy films